Seven ships of the Royal Navy have borne the name HMS Pincher:

 was a 12-gun gunvessel, also known as Gunboat No. 39. She was previously the civilian Two Sisters. She was purchased in 1797 and sold in 1802.
 was a 12-gun gunbrig launched in 1804 and sold in 1816.
 was a 5-gun schooner launched in 1827. She capsized in 1838, and was subsequently raised and sold that year.
 was a  wooden screw gunboat launched in 1854 and broken up by 1864.
 was an  iron screw gunboat launched in 1879 and sold in 1905.
 was a  launched in 1910 and wrecked in 1918.
 was an  launched in 1943 and scrapped in 1962.

Royal Navy ship names